Lalapati  is a village development committee in Saptari District in the Sagarmatha Zone of south-eastern Nepal. At the time of the 2011 Nepal census it had a population of 5,509 people living in 996 individual households.
After newly formed lower administrative division, Lalapati  belongs to Chhinnamasta Gaunpalika as Ward No.4. lalapatti laleswarnath mahadev

References

Populated places in Saptari District
VDCs in Saptari District